Cloud 9 The EP is the first extended play (EP) by recording artist Tinchy Stryder, and his fourth solo release to date. It was released on 31 March 2008 by Takeover Entertainment exclusively to iTunes UK store and U.S. store on 29 May 2011. Its cover art is a dark painting taken during the Star in the Hood promo shoot. The track, "Sorry, You Are?", featuring Chipmunk, from Stryder's 2007 debut studio album Star in the Hood, was included on the EP as track #2.

Track listing

References

2008 debut EPs
Tinchy Stryder albums
Takeover Entertainment EPs